CEQ may refer to:
 Council on Environmental Quality, an agency of the United States federal government
 Corporation des enseignants du Québec, a former name of the Centrale des syndicats du Québec, a trade union in Quebec, Canada
 Common ordinary equity, the common shareholders' interest in a company
 Covalence EthicalQuote, a market index tracking reputation of companies on ethical performance
 Cannes – Mandelieu Airport, by IATA code